Robert Carston Arneson (September 4, 1930 – November 2, 1992) was an American sculptor and professor of ceramics in the Art department at University of California, Davis for nearly three decades.

Early life and education 
Robert Carston Arneson was born on September 4, 1930 in Benicia, California. He graduated from Benicia High School and spent much of his early life as a cartoonist for a local paper. Arneson studied at California College of the Arts in Oakland, California for his BFA degree and went on to receive an MFA from Mills College in Oakland, California in 1958. At Mills College he studied under Antonio Prieto.

Career 
During the start of the 1960s, Arneson and several other California artists began to abandon the traditional manufacture of functional ceramic objects and instead began to make nonfunctional sculptures that made confrontational statements. The new movement was dubbed  Funk Art, and Arneson is considered the father of the ceramic Funk movement.

His body of work contains many self-portraits which have has been described as an "autobiography in clay". Doyen from 1972, in the collection of the Honolulu Museum of Art is an example of the artist's humorously caricatured self-portraits.

Even his large Eggheads sculptures bear a self-resemblance. Among the last works Arneson completed before his 1992 death, five Eggheads were installed on campus at UC Davis around 1994. The controversial pieces continue to serve as a source of interest and discussion on the campus, even inspiring a campus blog by the same name. Two additional copies of Eggheads were installed in San Francisco.

One of Arneson's most famous and controversial works is a bust of George Moscone, the mayor of San Francisco who was assassinated in 1978. Inscribed on the pedestal of the bust are words representing events in Moscone's life, including his assassination: the words "Bang Bang Bang Bang Bang", "Twinkies," and "Harvey Milk Too!" are visible on the front of the pedestal.

Teaching career

Arneson's teaching career began soon after receiving his MFA degree, with a stint at Santa Rosa Junior College, in Santa Rosa, California (1958 to1959). This was followed by a position at Fremont High School (1959 to 1960) in Oakland, California, before advancing to teach design and crafts at Mills College, also located in Oakland (1960 to 1962).

Arneson's next appointment in 1962 was at University of California, Davis, where his talents were recognized by Richard L. Nelson, who had founded the Art Department. It was during this period of the early 60s that Nelson was assembling a faculty that would come to be celebrated as one of the most prestigious in the nation. In addition to Arneson, Nelson had also selected Manuel Neri, Wayne Thiebaud and William T. Wiley, each of whom would go on to achieve international recognition. Initially hired to teach design classes (in the College of Agriculture), it was Arneson who established the ceramic sculpture program for the Art Department. It was in many ways a bold and radical move, in that ceramics were not yet recognized as a medium appropriate for fine art at that time. Since its founding, the UC Davis campus ceramics studio has been housed in a corrugated metal building known as TB-9, and it was here that Arneson held court for nearly three decades until his retirement in the summer of 1991.

Death and legacy
Arneson died on November 2, 1992, after a long battle with liver cancer. He was survived by his wife, Sandra Shannonhouse, and his five children. His home town of Benicia, California established a park in his memory, along the Carquinez Strait.

Collections 
Arneson's fame is far-reaching, and his works can be found in public and private collections around the world, including the Art Institute of Chicago, the Virginia Museum of Fine Arts (Richmond, Virginia), the Hirshhorn Museum and Sculpture Garden (Washington, DC), di Rosa (Napa, California), the Honolulu Museum of Art, the Metropolitan Museum of Art (New York City), the Museum of Contemporary Art (Kyoto, Japan), the San Francisco Museum of Modern Art, the Racine Art Museum (Racine, Wisconsin), the Smithsonian American Art Museum, the Whitney Museum of American Art (New York City), the Birmingham Museum of Art, and the US Embassy in Yerevan, Armenia. His creations are also at the Lowe Art Museum in Coral Gables, Florida.

The Nelson Gallery at UC Davis, where Arneson was a faculty member, owns 70 of the artist's works, including The Palace at 10am. The  earthenware sculpture, a depiction of his former Davis residence, is considered among his most famous sculptures. Several of his etchings and lithographs also are on display in the library.

Personal life 
Arneson's first marriage was to Jeanette Frank Jensen, from 1955 until 1972 and ended in divorce. Together Arneson and Jensen had four sons.

His second wife was artist Sandra Lynne Shannonhouse, they were married from 1973 until his death in 1992. They had a daughter Tenaya Arneson.

Publications

Footnotes

References
 Arneson, Robert, Arneson and the Object, University Park, PA. Palmer Museum of Art, 2004 
 Arneson, Robert and Jonathan Fineberg, Robert Arneson, Self-reflections, San Francisco, San Francisco Museum of Modern Art, 1997 
 Arneson, Robert and Helen Williams Drutt, Robert Arneson, Self-portraits, Philadelphia, Moore College of Art, 1979.
 Benezra, Neal, Robert Arneson, Seattle, University of Washington Press, 1986 .
 Benezra, Neal, Robert Arneson, a Retrospective, Des Moines, Iowa, Des Moines Art Center, 1985 
 Faberman, Hilarie, Tenley C. Bick and Susan C. Cameron, Fired at Davis: figurative ceramic sculpture by Robert Arneson, visiting professors, and students at the University of California at Davis, Stanford, Calif., Iris & B. Gerald Cantor Center for Visual Arts, 2005 
 Fineberg, Jonathan, "A Troublesome Subject: The Art of Robert Arneson," Berkeley, University of California Press, 2013 .
 Levin, Elaine, The History of American Ceramics: From Pipkins and Bean Pots to Contemporary Forms, 1607 to the Present, Hew York, Harry N. Abrams, 1988, pp. 227–230.
 Nash, Steven A., Arneson and Politics, a commemorative exhibition, San Francisco, Fine Arts Museums of San Francisco, 1993

External links 
 Robert Arneson's Eggheads
 Oral history interview with Robert Arneson, 1981 Aug. 14-15 from the Smithsonian Archives of American Art

1930 births
1992 deaths
20th-century ceramists
American ceramists
American potters
California College of the Arts alumni
Sculptors from California
University of California, Davis faculty
People from Benicia, California
20th-century American sculptors
20th-century American male artists
American male sculptors
20th-century American printmakers
Nut artists